Roobertchay Domingues da Rocha Filho (born 30 June 1992), known professionally as Chay Suede, is a Brazilian actor and singer-songwriter.

Career 
Suede's first television appearance was in the fifth season of the RecordTV show Ídolos (2010), where he finished in fourth place. Due to his popularity among the young audience, he was cast as one of the leads in the Brazilian version of the telenovela Rebelde (2011). After the band ended, Suede released his first self-titled album in 2013. Subsequently, he signed a contract with Rede Globo and portrayed José Alfredo, in the first phase of the telenovela Império (2014). In 2015, he played Rafael in the telenovela Babilônia.

In 2016, he portrayed Pedro Guedes Leitão in the telenovela A Lei do Amor, in its first phase.

Filmography

Television

Film

Discography

Awards and nominations

References

External links 

 
 

1992 births
Living people
People from Vila Velha
Brazilian male television actors
Brazilian male film actors
21st-century Brazilian male singers
21st-century Brazilian singers
21st-century Brazilian male actors